Grant Achilles (born June 11, 1983) is an American college baseball coach and former infielder, who is the current head baseball coach of the Brown Bears.

Playing career
Achilles attended Heritage High School in Lynchburg, Virginia. Achilles played for the school's varsity baseball team. Achilles then enrolled at Wake Forest University, to play college baseball for the Wake Forest Demon Deacons baseball team.

During his freshman and sophomore season, Achilles appeared in 13 games gathering twelve plate appearances going 0-for-6. He missed the entire 2004 season with a medical redshirt.

As a junior in 2005, Achilles had a .254 batting average, a .343 on-base percentage (OBP) and a .339 SLG.

As a senior in 2006, Achilles batted .185 with a .296 SLG, 1 home run, and 4 RBIs.

Coaching career
Achilles began his coaching career in 2007 as an assistant with the Charlotte 49ers baseball program. On August 28, 2007, Achilles was hired as a volunteer coach for the Western Carolina Catamounts baseball program. After three years at Western Carolina, Achilles returned to Wake Forest as a volunteer assistant. On September 22, 2011, Achilles was named an assistant at Georgetown. After just a season at Georgetown, Achilles left to become the top assistant at Brown.

On April 11, 2014, Marek Drabinski stepped down as the head coach and Achilles and Mike McCormack were named the interim head coaches the remainder of the year. After going 7–9 as the co-interim head coach, Achilles was named the lone head coach of Brown on June 23, 2014.

Head coaching record

See also
 List of current NCAA Division I baseball coaches

References

External links
Brown Bears bio

1983 births
Living people
Baseball coaches from Virginia
Baseball first basemen
Baseball outfielders
Baseball players from Virginia
Baseball second basemen
Brown Bears baseball coaches
Charlotte 49ers baseball coaches
Georgetown Hoyas baseball coaches
Sportspeople from Lynchburg, Virginia
Wake Forest Demon Deacons baseball coaches
Wake Forest Demon Deacons baseball players
Western Carolina Catamounts baseball coaches